NHN Japan Corporation is the Japanese subsidiary of NHN Entertainment Corporation.

NHN Comico 

NHN Comico operates Comico, a webtoon portal that is available in Japan, South Korea, Taiwan, and Thailand.

NHN PlayArt 
NHN PlayArt is video game developer who specialize in smartphone games.

References

External links
NHN Japan
NHN Comico
NHN PlayArt
NHN PlayArt English Site

Software companies of Japan
Online companies of Japan
Japanese subsidiaries of foreign companies
Internet technology companies of Japan